Wishes is an album by hard rock singer Jon Butcher. It was released in 1987 by Capitol Records. The album peaked at No. 77 on the Billboard 200. The singles of this album were "Wishes", "Goodbye Saving Grace" and "Holy War".

Track listing 
"Goodbye Saving Grace"
"Living for Tomorrow"
"Holy War"
"Wishes"
"Churinga"
"Long Way Home"
"Show Me Some Emotion"
"Little Bit of Magic"
"Angel Dressed in Blue"
"Partners in Crime"
"Prisoners of the Silver Chain"

Chart positions

Album

Singles

References

Jon Butcher albums
1987 albums
Capitol Records albums